The Suzdal constituency (No.80) is a Russian legislative constituency in Vladimir Oblast. The constituency covers parts of Vladimir and western Vladimir Oblast, most of the constituency formerly was placed into Vladimir constituency, but in 2016 Vladimir constituency was redistricted to the east, while new Suzdal constituency was created.

Members elected

Election results

2016

|-
! colspan=2 style="background-color:#E9E9E9;text-align:left;vertical-align:top;" |Candidate
! style="background-color:#E9E9E9;text-align:left;vertical-align:top;" |Party
! style="background-color:#E9E9E9;text-align:right;" |Votes
! style="background-color:#E9E9E9;text-align:right;" |%
|-
|style="background-color: " |
|align=left|Grigory Anikeyev
|align=left|United Russia
|
|64.70%
|-
|style="background-color:"|
|align=left|Lyudmila Bundina
|align=left|Communist Party
|
|9.90%
|-
|style="background-color:"|
|align=left|Valery Belyakov
|align=left|A Just Russia
|
|7.50%
|-
|style="background-color:"|
|align=left|Ilya Potapov
|align=left|Liberal Democratic Party
|
|7.08%
|-
|style="background:"| 
|align=left|Dmitry Kushpita
|align=left|Yabloko
|
|2.31%
|-
|style="background:"| 
|align=left|Sergey Klopov
|align=left|Communists of Russia
|
|1.98%
|-
|style="background-color:"|
|align=left|Aleksey Usachev
|align=left|Rodina
|
|1.30%
|-
|style="background-color:"|
|align=left|Kirill Nikolenko
|align=left|People's Freedom Party
|
|1.25%
|-
|style="background-color:#00A650"|
|align=left|Anna Kolesnik
|align=left|Civilian Power
|
|0.85%
|-
| colspan="5" style="background-color:#E9E9E9;"|
|- style="font-weight:bold"
| colspan="3" style="text-align:left;" | Total
| 
| 100%
|-
| colspan="5" style="background-color:#E9E9E9;"|
|- style="font-weight:bold"
| colspan="4" |Source:
|
|}

2021

|-
! colspan=2 style="background-color:#E9E9E9;text-align:left;vertical-align:top;" |Candidate
! style="background-color:#E9E9E9;text-align:left;vertical-align:top;" |Party
! style="background-color:#E9E9E9;text-align:right;" |Votes
! style="background-color:#E9E9E9;text-align:right;" |%
|-
|style="background-color: " |
|align=left|Grigory Anikeyev (incumbent)
|align=left|United Russia
|
|48.77%
|-
|style="background-color:"|
|align=left|Anton Sidorko
|align=left|Communist Party
|
|22.11%
|-
|style="background-color:"|
|align=left|Sergey Biryukov
|align=left|A Just Russia — For Truth
|
|6.96%
|-
|style="background-color:"|
|align=left|Kirill Menshikov
|align=left|New People
|
|4.86%
|-
|style="background-color:"|
|align=left|Vladimir Rykunov
|align=left|Liberal Democratic Party
|
|4.18%
|-
|style="background-color: "|
|align=left|Sergey Danilov
|align=left|Party of Pensioners
|
|4.18%
|-
|style="background:"| 
|align=left|Aleksey Firsov
|align=left|Yabloko
|
|2.52%
|-
|style="background-color:"|
|align=left|Vladimir Gogin
|align=left|Rodina
|
|2.05%
|-
| colspan="5" style="background-color:#E9E9E9;"|
|- style="font-weight:bold"
| colspan="3" style="text-align:left;" | Total
| 
| 100%
|-
| colspan="5" style="background-color:#E9E9E9;"|
|- style="font-weight:bold"
| colspan="4" |Source:
|
|}

References

Russian legislative constituencies
Politics of Vladimir Oblast